Rajat Kumar Kar (2 October 1934 – 8 May 2022) was an Indian playwright, Jagannath Culture researcher, and Radio & TV commentator. He had written more than 600 plays for radio. He was the longest and oldest active commentator of the World Famous Ratha Jatra of Lord Jagannath on both TV and Radio for more than 60 years. The Government of India honored him with the Padma Shri award in 2021 for his eminent works in Odia literature. He was a prolific writer on Upendra Bhanja literature and has seven non-fiction to his credit. He has also written a few books on Lord Jagannath.

Literary creation 
 Jana Jibanare Jagannath - 2006 (Basang Publication, Cuttack)
 Ananya Jagannath Anubhuthire - 2008 (Mahaveer Publication, Bhubaneswar)
 Andhaputuli - 1971 (J. Mohapatra & Co., Cuttack)
 Chandan Hajur - 1967 (Sahitya Mandir, Cuttack)
 Janana Janauchhi Jagannathnku - 1999 (Pravat Kumar Kar)
 Baisi Pabachha - 1999 (Shanti Publication, Bhubaneswar)
 Veer Chakhi Khuntia - 2003 (Ranjit Kar)
 Janamanasre Bhanja - 2007 (Basanti Publication, Cuttack)

Death 
Kar died at 87 on 8 May 2022 in a private hospital in Bhabaneswar due to heart disease.

References

External links 

 

1934 births
2022 deaths
People from Odisha
Indian actors
Ollywood
Recipients of the Padma Shri in literature & education
People from Cuttack district